Mark Edward Cubitt, 5th Baron Ashcombe  (born 29 February 1964) is a British hereditary peer and Conservative politician. In an October 2022 by-election, he was elected to replace The Earl of Home in the House of Lords following Home's death in August.,  He is distantly related to Queen Camilla of the United Kingdom. 

According to his candidate statement, Cubitt has a degree in civil engineering from Imperial College London, and has spent his career in the insurance industry, specialising in the energy sector. He lives in London and Hampshire.

References

External links

1964 births
Living people
Conservative Party (UK) hereditary peers
Alumni of Imperial College London
Politicians from Hampshire
Barons Ashcombe
Hereditary peers elected under the House of Lords Act 1999